Lymantriades is a genus of moths in the subfamily Lymantriinae. The genus was erected by George Thomas Bethune-Baker in 1911.

Species
Lymantriades obliqualinea Bethune-Baker, 1911 Angola
Lymantriades xanthosoma (Hampson, 1910) Sudan

References

Lymantriinae